Baku-Sara Babayeva Adina mekteb is an international school based in Baku, Azerbaijan. It was founded in 1998. The school offers education to children aged 4–18 years old. The six-story building includes a museum dedicated to the current president of Azerbaijan Ilham Aliyev on the ground floor.

References

External links 
 Official site

Schools in Baku